The 2014–15 Professional U21 Development League was the third season of the Professional Development League system.

League 1 

League 1, referred to as the Barclays Under 21 Premier League for sponsorship reasons, was split into two divisions, with teams allocated places in Division 1 or 2 based on their performance in the 2013–14 season.

At the end of the season, the team which finished top of Division 1 was crowned as overall League 1 champions, with the previously used knock-out system being abandoned. The top 8 teams qualified for the 2015–16 edition of the Premier League International Cup and the bottom two teams in Division 1 were relegated to Division 2 for the 2015–16 season, with the top teams in Division 2 moved in the opposite direction.

Division 1

Table

Results

Division 2

Table

Results

Awards 
Player of the season: Duncan Watmore (Sunderland)

Player of the month

League 2 

League 2, referred to as the Professional Development U21 League, is split into two regional divisions.

Teams will play each team in their own division twice, and each team in the other division once, for a total of 26 games for North division teams, and 27 games each for South division teams.

At the end of the season, the teams finishing in the top two positions of both divisions will meet in the knockout stage to determine the overall league champion.

League stage

North Division table

South Division table

Results

Knock-out stage

Semifinals

Final

See also
 2014–15 Professional U18 Development League
 2014–15 FA Cup
 2014–15 FA Youth Cup
 2014–15 Premier League International Cup
 2014–15 Under-21 Premier League Cup
 2014–15 in English football

References

2014–15 in English football leagues
2014-15